Sir William Talbot, 1st Baronet (died 1634), was an Irish lawyer and politician. He sat as MP for Kildare County in the Parliament of 1613–1615 and was in 1628 one of the negotiators of the Graces. However, he is probably mainly remembered as the father of Richard Talbot, 1st Earl of Tyrconnell.

{{Tree chart|WlmTb| |PtrTb| |RbtTb|y|GntFG|boxstyle=border-width: 1px; border-radius: 0.5em;
 |WlmTb=William
 |PtrTb=Peter
 |RbtTb=Robert
 |GntFG='GenetFitzGerald}}

 Birth and origins 
William was the son of Robert Talbot of Carton, County Kildare, and his wife Genet FitzGerald. His father was the third son of Thomas Talbot of Malahide, County Dublin. His father's family was Old English. The judge Sir Thomas Talbot (died 1487) was William's great-great-grandfather.

His mother was a daughter of Thomas fitz Bartholomew Fitzgerald.

 Early life 
Talbot was educated in the law, and attained a leading position as a lawyer in Dublin. About 1603 he was appointed Recorder of Dublin, but, being a staunch Catholic, which was a bar to public office, he was soon afterwards removed from office for recusancy.

 Marriage and children 
In or before 1608 Talbot married Alison, daughter of John Netterville of Castleton, County Meath.

 
William and Alison had eight sons:
 Robert (1608 – aft. 1670), his successor
 John
 Garret (died before May 1671), married Margaret Gaydon and was father of William, the 3rd baronet
 James
 Thomas, a Franciscan, chaplain to Queen Henrietta Maria
 Peter (1620–1680), became Catholic Archbishop of Dublin
 Gilbert, a Confederate officer, married Dorothy Boyle, widow of Adam Loftus and sister of Roger Boyle, Earl of Orrery
 Richard (c. 1625 – 1691), became Earl of Tyrconnell and Lord Lieutenant of Ireland during the reign of James  II, overhauling the Royal Irish Army that then fought in the Williamite War

—and eight daughters:
 Mary, married Sir John Dongan, 2nd Baronet, and had at least ten children, including Sir Walter Dongan, 3rd Baronet, William Dongan, 1st Earl of Limerick, and Thomas Dongan, 2nd Earl of Limerick
 Bridget
 Margaret (died 1662), married Sir Henry Talbot of Templeogue
 Frances, married James Cusack, son of Edward Cusack and grandson of Sir Thomas Cusack, Lord Chancellor of Ireland, and had three sons, Thomas, William and Nicholas
 Elizabeth
 Jane
 Catherine
 Eleanor, married Sir Henry O'Neill, 1st Baronet, of Killelagh, and was the mother of Sir Neil O'Neill and of Rose O'Neill, a foster daughter and heir-at-law of Rose MacDonnell, Marchioness of Antrim

 Later life 
 Parliament of 1613–1615 
On 13 April 1613 Talbot was elected to the Irish Parliament 1613–1615 as MP for County Kildare, and became the unofficial legal adviser to the Roman Catholic party in the Irish House of Commons (they were a minority in the House, but a large one). Thomas Ryves, a close ally of the new Speaker, complained to the Westminster government that Talbot had abetted the return to Parliament of two schismatics. During the stormy scenes which marked the election of the speaker in the Irish House of Commons, culminating with one of the rival speakers (a fat man) sitting on the other, Talbot urged that the House should first purge itself of members elected by illegal means.

On 30 May Talbot was appointed by the House as one of the deputies to represent to James I the corrupt practices employed in the elections to secure a Protestant majority, and the arbitrary treatment of the Anglo-Irish Catholics. He crossed to England in July, and was examined by the Privy Council on his conduct in the Irish House of Commons. During the discussion of this question, Archbishop George Abbot demanded Talbot's opinion on a book (probably the Defensio fidei Catholicae adversus Anglicanae sectae errores'') in which (he said) Francisco Suárez openly maintained the right of Catholics to kill a heretical king. Talbot hesitated, but acknowledged James as the lawful King. The Council was not satisfied with his answers, and on 17 July Talbot was committed to the Tower of London. On 13 November 1613 the Star Chamber sentenced him to a fine of £10,000. On 5 July 1614 Talbot was released and allowed to return to Ireland, and the fine was probably remitted. The King, on releasing him, disclaimed any intention of forcing the Irish Catholics to change their religion. From this time on Talbot became a supporter of the government, but took little part in politics.

Baronet 
On 4 February 1623 Talbot was created a baronet and thus became Sir William. Subsequently he received various grants of land.

The Graces 

In 1628 Talbot travelled to England to see the King as one of the 11 agents sent by the Irish to negotiate the Graces.

Death 
Talbot died on 16 March 1634 and is buried in Laraghbryan Cemetery outside Maynooth. He was succeeded by his eldest son Robert as the 2nd baronet.

Notes and references

Notes

Citations

Sources 

 
 
 
 
  – S to T
  – 1611 to 1625
 
 
 
 
 

 

1633 deaths
17th-century Irish lawyers
Baronets in the Baronetage of Ireland
Irish MPs 1613–1615
Members of the Parliament of Ireland (pre-1801) for County Kildare constituencies
Recorders of Dublin
William
Year of birth missing